The 2014 Campeonato Mineiro was the 100th edition of the state championship of Minas Gerais organized by the FMF. The competition began on 26 January and ended on 13 April 2014.

The competition was won by Cruzeiro winning their 38th Campeonato Mineiro. The final consisted of two 0-0 draws between Cruzeiro and Atlético Mineiro so Cruziero won the title by virtue of their superior performance in the first stage. Cruzeiro were unbeaten throughout the competition.

Format

First stage
The 2014 Módulo I first stage was contested by 12 clubs in a single round-robin tournament. The four best-placed teams qualified for the final stage and the bottom two teams were relegated to the 2015 Módulo II. The two best-placed teams not already qualified for the 2014 seasons of the Série A, Série B or Série C, gained berths in the 2014 Série D.

Knockout stage
The knockout stage was played between the 4 best-placed teams from the previous stage in a two-legged tie. If two teams tied on aggregate goals, the team that had the better results in the first stage would win the tie.

Participating teams

First stage

Semi-finals

Atlético Mineiro advanced to the finals.

Cruzeiro advanced to the finals.

Finals

Tied 0–0 on aggregate, Cruzeiro were declared champions due to their better performance in the first stage.

Final classification

Top goalscorers

References

External links
 Campeonato Mineiro Official Website

Campeonato Mineiro seasons
2014 in Brazilian football
Mineiro